The St. Augustine Bridge Company was incorporated on May 16, 1892, under the general incorporation laws of Florida, by O. B. Smith, M. S. Carter, Mathew Hays, Allen Wood and W. W. Dewhurst, for the purpose of constructing, maintaining and operating a toll road bridge between some point in the city of St. Augustine and Anastasia island.

Florida state law chapter 4279, approved June 2, 1893, extended the powers of the company to include issuing bonds, and required the bridge to be a drawbridge. 

The toll was not to exceed five cents per pedestrian, 25 cents for one-horse vehicles, 50 cents for two-horse vehicles, and other reasonable rates for other classes.

The corporation would dissolve after 99 years.

References 

Road bridges in Florida
St. Augustine, Florida
1890s in Florida
American companies established in 1893
Transport companies established in 1893